The 1980–81 Buffalo Sabres season was the Sabres' 11th season of operation for the National Hockey League franchise that was established on May 22, 1970. The team won their second consecutive Adams Division
regular season championship. As of 2012 this is the only time the Buffalo Sabres have won consecutive division titles.

Offseason

Regular season

Final standings

Schedule and results

Playoffs

Player statistics

Awards and records

Transactions

Draft picks
Buffalo's draft picks at the 1980 NHL Entry Draft held at the Montreal Forum in Montreal, Quebec.

Farm teams

See also
1980–81 NHL season

References

Buffalo Sabres seasons
Buffalo
Buffalo
Adams Division champion seasons
Buffalo
Buffalo